Rosalie Matondo (born April 18, 1963, in N'Djamena, Chad) is a Congolese agronomist and minister of the Forest Economy since May 7, 2016.
She was previously coordinator of the "National Program of Afforestation and Reforestation" (PRONAR) within the same Ministry (2011-2016), as well as adviser to the Head of State (2013-2016).

Biography 
Rosalie Matondo was born 18 April 1963 in N'Djamena (then known as Fort-Lamy) in Chad. She then studied at the Lycée de la Révolution where she obtained a bachelor's degree (series D) in 1983. She then enrolled at the Bulgarian Academy of Sciences, where she studied at the Department of Genetics of the Higher Institute of Science agronomy at Plovdiv. She obtained, in 1989, the higher diploma in agronomist engineering. Then, in 1993, she obtained the diploma of agronomic sciences in plant biotechnology from the Institute of Genetic Engineering at the same academy.

In 1994, she returned to Congo to join a vitro culture laboratory, hitherto led by French and English researchers, who had to leave Brazzaville because of the civil war. In particular, she cultivated tropical plants. In 1995, she joined the French Center for Agricultural Research for Development (CIRAD) as a researcher in forestry. She also joined the National School of Forest Administration (ENSAF - former Institute of Rural Development), where she worked as a teacher-researcher. In 2007, she was placed at the head of the national reforestation service.

References 

1963 births
Living people
Agricultural engineers
Environment ministers
Government ministers of the Republic of the Congo
Women government ministers of the Republic of the Congo
21st-century Republic of the Congo women politicians
21st-century Republic of the Congo politicians